Dennis Jon Kay (12 April 1948 – 27 November 2007) was a New Zealand cricketer. He played in fifteen first-class and two List A matches for Central Districts from 1974 to 1978.

After two first-class matches in 1974–75 and none in 1975–76, Kay had a successful season in 1976-77 when he took 33 wickets at an average of 16.48, including 7 for 62 (match figures of 11 for 138) against Canterbury in the Shell Trophy. He also took 3 for 60 and 4 for 38 in a losing cause against Otago in the final ten days later. After a few unsuccessful matches in 1977–78, he played no further first-class cricket.

See also
 List of Central Districts representative cricketers

References

External links
 

1948 births
2007 deaths
New Zealand cricketers
Central Districts cricketers
Cricketers from Palmerston North